The Bibliothèques de Laval, is the public library system of Laval, Quebec, Canada. It is one of the largest French language public library systems in the province and in North America. There are nine different branches listed below.

The bibliothèque Multiculturelle is the only one that has English and foreign language books; the other 9 are mostly French (with the exception of magazines, CDs, DVDs and videos). In 1995, Laval public library lent more than 2 million documents, to almost 92,000 readers in 25,731 opened hours.

Services
Information and reference services
Access to full text databases
Community information
Internet access
Reader's advisory services
Programs for children, youth and adults
Delivery to homebound individuals
Interlibrary loan
Free downloadable ebooks

Branches

Émile-Nelligan Laval-des-Rapides
Gabrielle-Roy Fabreville
Germaine-Guèvremont Duvernay
Laure-Conan Vimont
Marius-Barbeau Saint Francois
Multiculturelle Chomedey
Philippe-Panneton Laval Ouest
Sylvain-Garneau Sainte Rose
Yves-Thériault Ste Dorothee

External links
Official Website

References

Public libraries in Quebec
Buildings and structures in Laval, Quebec
Education in Laval, Quebec